San Francisco State University (San Francisco State, SF State and SFSU) is a public research university in San Francisco. It is part of the California State University system and offers 118 bachelor's degree programs, 94 master's degree programs, and 5 doctoral degree programs along with 26 teaching credentials among six academic colleges. It is classified among "R2: Doctoral Universities – High research activity".

The university was founded in 1899 as a state-run normal school for training school teachers, obtaining state college status in 1921 and state university status in 1972. The 141-acre campus is located in the southwest part of the city, less than two miles from the Pacific coast. San Francisco State has 12 varsity athletic teams which compete at the NCAA Division II level, most as members of the California Collegiate Athletic Association. San Francisco State is an Hispanic-serving institution (HSI) and is eligible to be designated as an Asian American Native American Pacific Islander serving institution (AANAPISI).

San Francisco State's past and present faculty and alumni include 21 Pulitzer Prize winners, 16 Academy Award winners, 49 Emmy Award winners, 10 Grammy Award winners, 12 Tony Award laureates, 4 billionaires, and 1 astronaut.

History

 1899 – Founded as San Francisco State Normal School, in the first year enrollment was 31 women, and the campus originally located on Powell Street near Clay Street.
 1901 – First graduating class.
 1906 – The 1906 earthquake and fire forces the school to relocate from Nob Hill to a temporary campus at the Grant School in Oakland, followed by a new campus at Buchanan and Haight Streets.
 1921 – Renamed San Francisco State Teachers College
 1923 – First Bachelor of Arts degree awarded
 1929 – First known African-American to graduate from the school is teacher Grace Hackett.
 1935 – Renamed San Francisco State College
 1953 – Current campus near Lake Merced opens; it is formally dedicated in October, 1954.
 1966 – Beginning of the era of campus protests led by student organizations including the Black Student Union, Third World Liberation Front, and Students for a Democratic Society. They protested college policies and off-campus issues such as the Vietnam War with sit-ins, rallies, marches, and teach-ins, sometimes clashing violently with police.
 1968–1969 – A lengthy student strike erupted in November, led by the Black Student Union and the Third World Liberation Front, who demanded an Ethnic Studies program and an end to the Vietnam War. It was a major news event for weeks in the aftermath of the assassination of Martin Luther King Jr. The strike ended in March 1969 with an agreement to create the School (now College) of Ethnic Studies.
 1972 – Received university status as California State University, San Francisco
 1974 – Renamed San Francisco State University
 1975 – Cesar Chavez Student Center opened its doors to students
 1993 – Downtown campus opened
 1994 – A mural depicting Malcolm X was painted on the student union building, commissioned by the Pan-African Student Union and African Student Alliance. The mural's border contained yellow Stars of David and dollar signs mingled with skulls and crossbones and near the words "African Blood." The next week, after demonstrations on both sides, the school administration had the mural painted over, and subsequently sand blasted. Two years later a new Malcolm X mural was painted, without the controversial symbols.
 1999 – Celebrated 100th birthday
 2007 – Downtown Campus opened at 835 Market Street
 2013 – The Science Building was found to have "unsafe levels" of airborne mercury, lead and asbestos in the basement as a result of reports that pesticide-laden Native American artifacts were previously stored with a material now known to be highly hazardous. As a result of the contamination, over $3.6 million was spent for remediation of the pervasive contamination.  University Administration terminated several employees who reported the contamination, resulting in several wrongful termination and whistle-blower lawsuits, including one by the recently hired director. In July 2014, Cal/OSHA cited the university for various health and safety violations in the Science Building, which included SFSU failing to locate asbestos in the building and warn employees about the hazards of mercury. SFSU previously ran into trouble with its Environmental Health and Safety program when the director prior, Robert Shearer, was accused of taking bribes from a waste disposal firm in exchange for at least $4 million in university funds.

 2017 – A group of Jewish students accused SFSU of encouraging anti-Semitism, and excluding Jewish student pro-Israel activist groups from campus activities. These students filed a court case, however a federal judge dismissed the suit in 2018. The suit was later settled out of court, with the settlement including a provision to hire a new Director of Jewish Student life.  In 2019 the university granted Zionist student groups equal rights with other student groups.
 2020 – SFSU faculty Rabab Abdulhadi and Tomomi Kinukawa were hosting a virtual class lecture on Zoom (software) by Leila Khaled, a Palestinian political activist with a militant history, when the Zoom canceled the broadcast due to Khaled's history of violent actions towards civilians. The event brought SFSU into a tense national news debate.

Presidents

 Frederic Lister Burk (1899–1924)
 Archibald B. Anderson (1924–1927)
 Mary A. Ward (1927; interim president)
 Alexander C. Roberts (1927–1945)
 J. Paul Leonard (1945–1957)
 Glenn Dumke (1957–1961)
 Frank L. Fenton (1961–1962)
 Paul A. Dodd (1962–1965)
 Stanley F. Paulson (1965–1966)
 John Summerskill (1966–1968)
 Robert R. Smith (1968)
 S. I. Hayakawa (1968–1973)
 Paul F. Romberg (1973–1983)
 Chia-Wei Woo (1983–1988)
 Robert A. Corrigan (1988–2012)
 Leslie Wong (2012–2019)
 Lynn Mahoney (2019–present)

Academics
Fall Freshman Statistics

In Fall of 2021, the university had 1,801 instructional faculty, of which 706 (or 39 percent) were on the tenure track.

The university's academic colleges are:
 Liberal & Creative Arts
 Business
 Education
 Ethnic Studies
 Health and Social Sciences
 Science and Engineering

In addition, the university has a College of Extended Learning. There is also an unofficial eighth college, the Experimental College, which allows students to teach each other.

SF State is on the semester system.

The university awards bachelor's degrees in 115 areas of specialization, master's degrees in 97, and a doctor of education (Ed.D.) in educational leadership. It jointly offers three doctoral programs: a doctorate in education in partnership with University of California, Berkeley with a concentration in special education, and two doctorates in physical therapy with University of California, San Francisco.

The most popular undergraduate majors are Business Administration, Biology, Kinesiology, Engineering, English, Communication Studies, Psychology, Criminal Justice Studies, Sociology, and Cinema. The student-faculty ratio at San Francisco State University is 23:1, and 27.1 percent of its classes have fewer than 20 students.

Accreditation
The university is accredited by the WASC Accrediting Commission for Senior Colleges and Universities. The College of Business is accredited by the Association to Advance Collegiate Schools of Business (AACSB International). The School of Engineering is accredited by the Accreditation Board for Engineering and Technology (ABET).

Distinctions and rankings

In 2020, San Francisco State was ranked the 19th top university in the United States by PayScale and CollegeNET's Social Mobility Index university rankings. In 2022, the Philosophical Gourmet Report listed San Francisco State University as one of the top eight universities to earn a terminal MA in philosophy.  SFSU was one of the first California State University campuses to offer a doctorate of education. It was also instrumental in the establishment of the International University of Kyrgyzstan (1993). The university is the only one in California to offer a bachelor's degree in technical and professional writing. It is also the only university in the California State University system to offer a master's degree in Classics.

In 2011, SFSU ranked 18th among the top 20 undergraduate schools whose alumni went on to be admitted to the State Bar; many subsequently ran for public office. The university's College of Extended Learning offers the only American Bar Association-approved paralegal studies program in San Francisco.

The Cinema Department, in the College of Liberal & Creative Arts, was named one of the world's best film schools by Variety in 2019. SFSU was also listed as one of the nation's top 25 film schools by The Hollywood Reporter, having produced many leading filmmakers, with over 13 Academy Award wins among its alumni.

The Sutro Library, located within the J. Paul Leonard Library, houses the largest collection of genealogical records west of Salt Lake City.

Diversity

In 1969, the longest student strike in U.S. history resulted in the establishment of the college of Ethnic Studies and increased recruiting and admissions of students of different and varied ethnic backgrounds.

In 2010, Forbes ranked San Francisco State as the 11th most diverse college in America, citing 51% minority students. Among 121 Western Universities, San Francisco State was ranked sixth in terms of campus diversity by U.S. News & World Report in 2013. In 2016, San Francisco State was ranked as the most diverse student body among the 100 largest American universities by Priceonomics.

San Francisco State has the second largest Asian and Filipino American enrollment percentage in the Cal State system.

Main campus buildings

Academic buildings
 Burk Hall (BH)
 Business (BUS)
 Creative Arts (CA)
 Ethnic Studies & Psychology (EP)
 Fine Arts (FA)
 Health & Social Sciences (HSS)
 Hensill Hall (HH)
 Humanities (HUM)
 Liberal and Creative Arts (LCA)
 J. Paul Leonard Library (LIB)
 Science (SCI)
 Sutro Library (in LIB)
 Thornton Hall (TH)
 Marcus Hall (MH)

Residence buildings, communities, and services
 City Eats Dining Center (DC)
 Manzanita Square (MZS)
 Mary Park Hall (MPH)
 Mary Ward Hall (MWH)
 Towers Junior Suites (TJS)
 The Towers at Centennial Square (TCS)
 The Village at Centennial Square (VCS)
 University Park North (UPN)
 University Park South (UPS)

A dormitory building, Verducci Hall, was imploded in 1999, having sustained damage from the 1989 Loma Prieta earthquake.

Conference facilities
 Seven Hills Conference Center
 Towers Conference Center
Note: The Downtown Campus has a conference room. The Bay Conference Center is located in the Romberg Tiburon Campus.

Student life and Administrative services

 Administration (ADM)
 Cesar Chavez Student Center (CCSC)
 Children's Campus (formerly Child Care Center) (A.S. ECEC)
 Mashouf Wellness Center (MWC)
 Student Health Center (SHS)
 Student Services (SSB)

Athletic facilities
 Cox Stadium
 Gymnasium (GYM)
 Maloney Field

Satellite campuses 
In addition to the main campus, the school also has three satellite campuses.

The Downtown Campus is part of the Lam Family College of Business and the College of Extended Learning and is located in the office area of Westfield San Francisco Centre.

The Sierra Nevada Field Campus is located in Sierra County near Yuba Pass and the Sierra Valley and offers accredited courses to the general public.

The Romberg Tiburon Campus is a 53-acre research campus located in Marin County. It is home to the Estuary and Ocean Science Center, a marine research lab.

The daycare center on the main campus is known as the Children's Campus.

Athletics

The school's intercollegiate athletics teams, nicknamed the Gators, compete in NCAA Division II and are a member of the California Collegiate Athletic Association (wrestling competes in the Rocky Mountain Athletic Conference). SF State fields twelve sports: men's and women's cross country, men's and women's soccer, women's volleyball, men's and women's basketball, men's baseball, wrestling, indoor track and field, outdoor track and field and softball.

SF State has produced three Major League Baseball players, of which two became All-Stars (former Mets shortstop Bud Harrelson, and former Brewers and Red Sox outfielder Tommy Harper). The soccer program has had one player enter the professional ranks. Jared MacLane played in the soccer Professional First Division in Santa Cruz, Bolivia.

The Gators have also produced thirteen National Football League players, including Billy Baird, Elmer Collett, Maury Duncan, Carl Kammerer, Douglas Parrish, and Floyd Peters. Mike Holmgren got his collegiate coaching start as the team's Offensive Coordinator in 1981. The football program ended in 1995.

SF State Wrestling sent a wrestler to a national championship meet every year from 1963–64 to 2016–17.

As of 2019, the Gators have earned one NCAA team championship at the Division II level:
 Men's (1)
 Wrestling (1): 1997

Mascot
The school first adopted their mascot, the Gator, in 1931. After a call for a mascot by the student newspaper the Bay Leaf, students suggested the "alligator" for its strength and steadfastness. The students also suggested the spelling "Golden Gaters," with an "e," in reference to the Golden Gate. Students voted in favor of the name, but after numerous "misspellings" by the newspaper, the use of Gator, with an "o," stuck.

Culture
Associated Students host the San Francisco State Folk Festival. including 5th Annual San Francisco State College Folk Festival April 15–17, 1966. 7th Annual San Francisco State College Folk Festival April 24–27, 1968, 2nd Annual San Francisco State College Folk Festival 1963, with Jerry Garcia and Robert Hunter (lyricist) 6th Annual San Francisco State College Folk Festival in March and April 1967,  4th Annual San Francisco State College Folk Festival 1965. San Francisco State College Folk Festival, September 25, 1970.

KSFS
KSFS is a college radio station run by Broadcast and Electronic Communication Arts (BECA) students, streaming online, at 100.7 on Comcast Cable radio in San Francisco, and at 88.1 FM near the SFSU campus mini transmitter.

Notable faculty and alumni

See also

 Bay Area Television Archive
 DOC Film Institute
 Fourteen Hills: The Creative Writing MFA program's literary magazine
 New American Writing: once-a-year literary magazine

Notes

References

External links

 
 San Francisco State Athletics website

 
San Francisco
San Francisco
Universities and colleges in San Francisco
Sunset District, San Francisco
Schools accredited by the Western Association of Schools and Colleges
Educational institutions established in 1899
1899 establishments in California
Universities established in the 1970s